RDP may refer to:

Computing
 Ramer–Douglas–Peucker algorithm, an algorithm for polygonal simplification
 Recombination detection program, for analysing genetic recombination
 Recursive descent parser, a type of top-down parser
 Remote Desktop Protocol, a Microsoft remote access network protocol
 Reliable Data Protocol, a transport layer network protocol

Organisations
 Rally for Democracy and Progress (disambiguation), several political parties
 Democratic and Popular Rally, a Burkina Faso political party

Other uses
 RDP (film), Fujifilm photographic films
 , a Brazilian hardcore band
 Reconstruction and Development Programme, South Africa
 Recreational Dive Planner
 Roll of Distinguished Philatelists
 Kazi Nazrul Islam Airport, Andal, West Bengal, India, IATA code